The 1980 Delaware gubernatorial election took place on November 4, 1980. Popular incumbent Republican Governor Pierre S. "Pete" du Pont IV was re-elected to a second term in office, defeating Democrat William Gordy. In doing so, du Pont became the first Governor since J. Caleb Boggs to succeed in winning re-election.

Election results

References

See also

Delaware
1980
Gubernatorial